Cell division cycle 26 is a protein that in humans is encoded by the CDC26 gene.

Function

The protein encoded by this gene is highly similar to Saccharomyces cerevisiae Cdc26, a component of cell cycle anaphase-promoting complex (APC). APC is composed of a group of highly conserved proteins and functions as a cell cycle-regulated ubiquitin-protein ligase. APC thus is responsible for the cell cycle regulated proteolysis of various proteins. [provided by RefSeq, Jul 2008].

External links 
 PDBe-KB provides an overview of all the structure information available in the PDB for Human Anaphase-promoting complex subunit CDC26

References